Tan Kaiyuan (born 19 August 2001) is a Chinese footballer currently playing as a midfielder for RCD Espanyol B.

Club career
Tan Kaiyuan was promoted to the senior team of Guangzhou Evergrande within the 2020 Chinese Super League season and would make his debut in a league game on 25 July 2020 against Shanghai Shenhua in a 2-0 victory.

Career statistics

Honours
Guangzhou Evergrande
Chinese FA Super Cup: 2018

References

External links

2001 births
Living people
Chinese footballers
Association football midfielders
Chinese Super League players
Guangzhou F.C. players
FK Vojvodina players